George Bernard Shaw (1856–1950) was an Irish playwright.

Bernard Shaw may also refer to:

 Bernard Shaw (footballer, born before 1900), English football player, 1890–1891
 Bernard Shaw (footballer, born 1945), English football player
 Bernard Shaw (journalist) (1940–2022), American journalist and CNN anchorman
 Bernard L. Shaw (1930–2020), English chemist
 Bernie Shaw (born 1956), Canadian singer for the band Uriah Heep
LÉ George Bernard Shaw (P64), ship of the Irish Naval Service